Ramabanta is a town in western Lesotho. It is located southeast of the capital Maseru, and northwest of the 3096 metre peak of Thaba Putsoa.

References
Fitzpatrick, M., Blond, B., Pitcher, G., Richmond, S., and Warren, M. (2004) South Africa, Lesotho and Swaziland. Footscray, VIC: Lonely Planet.

Populated places in Maseru District